Cyprinus  is the genus of typical carps in family Cyprinidae. Most species in the genus are of East Asia origin with only the common carp (C. carpio) in Western Asia and Europe; this invasive species has also been introduced to many other regions around the world. Cyprinus are closely related to some more barb-like genera, such as Cyclocheilichthys and Barbonymus (tinfoils). The crucian carps (Carassius) of western Eurasia, which include the goldfish (C. auratus), are apparently not as closely related.

This genus's most widespread and well-known member is the common carp (C. carpio) species complex. Although traditionally considered a single species, recent authorities have split the European and West Asian populations from the East Asian, with the latter named C. rubrofuscus (syn. C. carpio haematopterus). Members of the species complex are famed as a food fish and have been widely traded and introduced since antiquity, but in certain areas has multiplied inordinately and become a pest. In its long use it has been domesticated, and a number of breeds have been developed for food and other purposes. The koi (from Japanese nishikigoi, 錦鯉) are well-known carp breeds, selectively bred for being enjoyed by spectators from above. Strictly speaking, koi is simply the Japanese name of the East Asian carp.

The other species of typical carp are generally found in more restricted areas of eastern Asia, centered on the Yunnan region. In some cases, they are endemic to a single lake, most notably Lake Erhai, as well as Lake Dian, Fuxian Lake, Lake Jilu, Lake Qilihu, Lake Xingyun and Lake Yi-Lung, which are all in Yunnan proper. Several of these species are seriously threatened and five are possibly already extinct: C. yilongensis (Lake Yi-Lung), C. yunnanensis (Lake Qilihu),  C. daliensis (Lake Erhai), C. megalophthalmus (Lake Erhai) and C. fuxianensis (Fuxian Lake).

Species 

The following species are currently recognized in the genus.

 Cyprinus acutidorsalis H. L. Chen & H. Q. Huang, 1977
 Cyprinus barbatus H. L. Chen & H. Q. Huang, 1977
 Cyprinus carpio Linnaeus, 1758 
 Cyprinus chilia H. W. Wu, G. R. Yang, P. Q. Yue & H. J. Huang, 1963
 Cyprinus dai (V. H. Nguyễn & L. H. Doan, 1969)
 Cyprinus daliensis H. L. Chen & H. Q. Huang, 1977
 Cyprinus exophthalmus Đ. Y. Mai, 1978
 Cyprinus fuxianensis Yang et al., 1977
 Cyprinus hieni T. T. Nguyen & A. T. Ho, 2003
 Cyprinus hyperdorsalis V. H. Nguyễn, 1991
 Cyprinus ilishaestomus H. L. Chen & H. Q. Huang, 1977
 Cyprinus intha Annandale, 1918
 Cyprinus longipectoralis H. L. Chen & H. Q. Huang, 1977
 Cyprinus longzhouensis Y. J. Yang & H. Q. Huang, 1977
 Cyprinus megalophthalmus H. W. Wu et al., 1963
 Cyprinus melanes (Đ. Y. Mai, 1978)
 Cyprinus micristius Regan, 1906
 Cyprinus multitaeniatus Pellegrin & Chevey, 1936
 Cyprinus pellegrini T. L. Tchang, 1933
 Cyprinus qionghaiensis C. H. Liu, 1981
 Cyprinus quidatensis T. T. Nguyen, V. T. Le, T. B. Le & X. K. Nguyễn, 1999
 Cyprinus rubrofuscus Lacépède, 1803 
 †Cyprinus yilongensis Yang et al., 1977
 Cyprinus yunnanensis T. L. Tchang, 1933

Fossil species 
 †Cyprinus priscus von Meyer (fossil species from Miocene Germany)

Footnotes

References 

  (2007): Evolutionary origin of Lake Tana's (Ethiopia) small Barbus species: indications of rapid ecological divergence and speciation. Anim. Biol. 57(1): 39-48.  (HTML abstract)

 
Cyprininae
Carp
Fauna of Yunnan
Extant Miocene first appearances
Taxa named by Carl Linnaeus
Freshwater fish genera